Centenary College of Louisiana is a private liberal arts college in Shreveport, Louisiana. The college is affiliated with the United Methodist Church. Founded in 1825, it is the oldest chartered liberal arts college west of the Mississippi River and is accredited by the Southern Association of Colleges and Schools (SACS).

History

Centenary College of Louisiana is the oldest college in Louisiana and is the nation's oldest chartered liberal arts college west of the Mississippi River. Centenary traces its origins to two earlier institutions. In 1825, the Louisiana state legislature issued a charter for the College of Louisiana at Jackson. Its curriculum included courses in English, French, Greek, Latin, logic, rhetoric, ancient and modern history, mathematics, and natural, moral, and political philosophy. In 1839, the Mississippi Conference of the Methodist Episcopal Church, South, established Centenary College, first located in Clinton, Mississippi, then relocated to Brandon Springs. When the College of Louisiana lost the financial support from the state legislature in 1845, Centenary College purchased the facility and moved to Jackson.

In 1846, the college's trustees changed the institution's name to Centenary College of Louisiana and adopted the alumni of the two predecessor colleges. During the 1850s, enrollment reached 260, and the college constructed a large central building, which included classrooms, laboratories, literary society rooms, a library, a chapel, offices, and an auditorium with seating for over 2,000 people. This prosperity halted with the American Civil War. Following a meeting on October 7, 1861, the faculty minute book states, "Students have all gone to war. College suspended; and God help the right!" During the war, both Confederate and Union troops occupied the campus’ buildings. Centenary reopened in the fall of 1865, though struggled financially through the remainder of the nineteenth century. In 1906, the Louisiana Conference of the Methodist Episcopal Church, South, accepted an offer from the Shreveport Progressive League to relocate the college. The Jackson campus now serves as the Centenary State Historic Site operated by the Louisiana Office of State Parks; it is listed on the National Register of Historic Places.

Centenary opened in Shreveport, Louisiana, in 1908. Enrollment and course offerings increased during the 1920s, and Centenary received accreditation from the Southern Association of Colleges and Schools in 1925. During the 1920s and 1930s, the college's football program earned fame for defeating such teams as Baylor, LSU, Rice, SMU, and Texas A & M. The Centenary College Choir, formed in 1941, began performing throughout the region and eventually expanded to making national as well as international tours. In 1942, Centenary acquired a satellite campus, the former Dodd College, which served as a pre-flight training facility for air force cadets. Following the Second World War, the college undertook many new construction projects – dormitories, a cafeteria, a science building, a religious education center, a chapel, an expanded student center, a library, a theater, and a music building.

Presidents

College of Louisiana (Jackson, Louisiana)
Jeremiah Chamberlain (1826–1829)
Henry H. Gird (1829–1834)
James Shannon (1835–1840)
William B. Lacey (1841–1845)

Centenary College (Brandon Springs, Mississippi)
Thomas C. Thornton (1841–1844)

Centenary College of Louisiana (Jackson, Louisiana)
David O. Shattuck (1844–1848)
Augustus Baldwin Longstreet (1848–1849)
Richard H. Rivers (1849–1853)
John C. Miller (1855–1866)
William H. Watkins (1866–1871)
Charles G. Andrews (1871–1882)
D. M. Rush (1882–1885)
T. A. S. Adams (1885–1888)
W. L. C. Hunnicutt (1888–1894)
Charles W. Carter (1894–1898)
Inman J. Cooper (1898–1902)
Henry B. Carre (1902–1903)
Charles C. Miller (1903–1906)

Centenary College of Louisiana (Shreveport, Louisiana)

William Lander Weber (1907–1910)
Felix R. Hill (1910–1913)
Robert H. Wynn (1913–1918)
W. R. Bourne (1919–1921)
George Sexton (1921–1932)
William Angie Smith (interim, 1932–1933)
Pierce Cline (1933–1945)
Joe J. Mickle (1945–1964)
Jack Stauffer Wilkes (1964–1969)
John Horton Allen (1969–1976)
Donald A. Webb (1977–1991)
Kenneth L. Schwab (1991–2009)
B. David Rowe (2009–2016)
Christopher L. Holoman (2016–present)

Campus

Centenary College's campus spans sixty-five acres and is located two miles south of downtown Shreveport. The Dr. Ed Leuck Academic Arboretum, located in the heart of campus, is home to more than 300 species of plant life.

Major buildings
The Anderson Choral Building, named in memory of G. M. "Jake" and Dr. Gertie Anderson, longtime trustees and benefactors of the college, the building houses the Nancy Mikell Carruth Choir Room, the Dr. Alberta E. Broyles Choral Room, and the Harvey and Alberta Broyles Choral Lounge. The Anderson building also contains a soundproof practice room and atrium.
The Brown Memorial Chapel was erected in 1955, after a gift was made by the late Paul M. Brown, Jr., Chairman Emeritus of the Board of Trustees, and his brother, Colonel S. Perry Brown, a life member of the Board, in honor of their parents. The chapel was renovated and rededicated in January 2003 and hosts religious services and special events.

Bynum Memorial Commons, the cafeteria, built in 1956, was named in 1974 to honor Robert Jesse Bynum, New Orleans businessman and benefactor of the college.  A generous grant from the Frost Foundation funded a 2006 renovation of the entire building, including the Edwin Frost Whited Room and the Centenary Alumni Hall of Fame.

The Gold Dome, completed in 1971, is a physical education facility. The geodesic dome has a capacity of 3,000 and serves as the home basketball and volleyball court and gymnastics arena. After a recent renovation in 2011, the Gold Dome features a new hardwood painted floor, updated sub-floor electronics, premium seating, and a new Hi-Fi public address system.
Hamilton Hall, the administration building completed in 1971, was largely the result of gifts by the late Mr. and Mrs. David Philip Hamilton. Mrs. Hamilton was a trustee of the college and a member of the first Centenary class to graduate in Shreveport.
The Hargrove Memorial Amphitheatre was a gift of Mrs. R. H. Hargrove and her children and was built in memory of her husband, Mr. Reginald H. Hargrove. It is used for convocations, plays, and concerts.
The Meadows Museum of Art, established in 1975, was created from the gift of Centenary alumnus Algur H. Meadows.  After donating 360 works by the French artist Jean Despujols, Meadows also provided funding to renovate the former administrative building into a museum.  The museum's permanent collection now includes around 1500 works by various artists and regularly hosts exhibits that aim to educate students and the public on the importance of art.

Academics

Centenary is a selective liberal arts college with 25 majors in the arts and sciences, numerous academic concentrations, a variety of pre-professional programs, and two graduate programs.

Accreditation 

Centenary College of Louisiana is accredited by the Commission on Colleges of the Southern Association of Colleges and Schools to award bachelors’ and master's degrees. The college also maintains membership in the American Council on Education, the Association of American Colleges and Universities, American Association of Collegiate Registrars and Admissions Officers, the American Association of University Women, the Conference of Louisiana Colleges and Universities, the Council for Advancement and Support of Education, the Institute of International Education, the Louisiana Academy of Science, the Association of Departments of English of the Modern Language Association, the Association of Departments of Foreign Languages of the Modern Language Association, the National Association of Schools and Colleges of The United Methodist Church, the Associated Colleges of the South, and the Louisiana Association of Independent Colleges and Universities. Centenary College is a participant in the Common Application Program. The music program is accredited by the National Association of Schools of Music.

Reputation 

In 2013 Princeton Review named Centenary one of the "Best 376 Colleges" and "Best Southeastern Colleges," putting the college in the top 15% of all four-year colleges in the country. Forbes.com recognized Centenary as one of "America's Best Colleges" overall, "Best Private Colleges," and "Best Colleges in the South," and awarded an "A" grade for financial fitness. U.S. News & World Report placed the college in Tier One of its annual National Liberal Arts Colleges rankings. Other accolades include recognition for community service.

Student life

Centenary puts emphasis on co-curricular activities and gives its students an unlimited number of opportunities on and off campus from Greek life to student media, and service to politics.

Greek life
The Greek social organizations at Centenary College are three national fraternities: Kappa Alpha and Tau Kappa Epsilon; and two national sororities: Chi Omega and Zeta Tau Alpha. In addition to encouraging academic excellence, the Greek system provides opportunities to form lifelong friendships, develop leadership skills, and participate in community service projects and social activities.

Fitness and intramurals
The Centenary Fitness Center contains a basketball/volleyball court, a 6 lane 25-yard swimming pool, an indoor track, an exercise area with weight machines and cardiovascular equipment, an aerobic room, a dance studio, and two racquetball courts. The center offers exercise classes, such as spinning, abs, yoga, and Pilates. There is also a 52’ climbing tower outside the fitness center.

Intramural activities are offered through the fitness center. Some of the sports the students participate in are flag football, bowling, outdoor soccer, volleyball, basketball, softball, racquetball, and swimming.

Athletics

Centenary is currently a member of the NCAA Division III's Southern Collegiate Athletic Conference (SCAC), having moved from the American Southwest Conference (ASC) after the 2011–12 academic year. Prior to July 2011, the college was a member of The Summit League in NCAA Division I.

The first official records of athletic teams at Centenary College are to be found in the 1908–1909 college catalog and 
the November 1909 issue of the Maroon and White, a monthly publication edited by the students.

Centenary fields 20 intercollegiate athletic teams including football, baseball, basketball, cross country, golf, lacrosse, soccer, and swimming for men; and basketball, cross country, golf, gymnastics, soccer, softball, swimming, tennis, and volleyball for women.

The school is well known for its basketball prominence in the late 1970s being the college for NBA great Robert Parish, and golf ability—in the early 1980s PGA Tour golfer Hal Sutton played there.

U.S. Olympics Women's Gymnastics Coach (Tokyo, 1964) Vannie Edwards coached the Centenary women's gymnastics team from 1964 to 1968 and again from 1977 to 1985. Coach Edwards was also the team manager for the U.S. Olympics Women's Gymnastics teams in 1968 (Mexico City) and 1972 (Munich). He was inducted into the U.S. Gymnastics Hall of Fame in 1986.

Centenary previously fielded a college football team. From 1927 thru 1936, the team compiled a record of 73–22–11, including two undefeated seasons (1927 & 1932). The 1927 team featured wins over four powers in the Southwest Conference: Southern Methodist, Baylor, Rice, and Texas Christian. The 1932 team featured wins over Louisiana State, Texas, Texas A&M, and Mississippi. Head Coach Homer Norton left Centenary after the 1933 season, and success and fan interest dwindled. After an 0–8–2 season in 1941, the team was discontinued for the duration of World War II due to budget deficits. Football resumed in 1947, but after winning only one game during the season, the football program was halted for good in December 1947. In 2022 Centenary announced that football was to return, with play commencing in the fall off 2024. 

The school sport's nickname is the Gents; the women's sports' nickname is the Ladies.  Prior to adopting the Gents nickname, Centenary's football team was known as the Old Ironsides and had a reputation as a fearsome and powerful team with a penchant for playing rough.  To clean up their image, they selected the Gents nickname.

In 2013, the Centenary Gents baseball team won the SCAC regular season. It was the school's first regular season championship in any sport since 1991. The Gents baseball team also won the SCAC regular season in 2015. Also, former Centenary Pitcher, Seth Lugo made his MLB debut for the New York Mets on July 1, 2016. Former Centenary Gents pitcher James Hoyt (baseball) was called up by the Houston Astros on August 2, 2016. This marked the first time that two Centenary alumni had played in Major League Baseball at the same time. Hoyt and Lugo were teammates on the 2009 and 2010 Centenary Gents teams.

Notable people

Alumni
Nathan Allen (Class of 1967) – internationally recognized trial lawyer, conservationist and patron of the arts
Calhoun Allen (1921–1991) – Mayor of Shreveport from 1970 to 1978, utilities commissioner from 1962 to 1970, and city council member in 1991 until his death that year
Lonnie O. Aulds (1925–1984, Class of 1950) – Louisiana state representative from Caddo Parish from 1968 to 1972; real estate developer in Shreveport 
Brady Blade – drummer, music producer, founded record label Brick Top Recordings LLC, and owner of Blade Studios
Algie D. Brown (Class of 1934, 1910–2004) – member of the Louisiana House of Representatives for Caddo Parish from 1948 to 1972
Riemer Calhoun (Class of 1930, 1909–1994) –  member of the Louisiana State Senate for Caddo and DeSoto parishes from 1944 to 1952
Cecil K. Carter, Jr. (1929–1987) – Louisiana state senator for Caddo Parish, 1972 to 1976
Sherri Smith Buffington – member of the Louisiana State Senate since 2004
John William Corrington – poet and author; early television writing pioneer
George W. D'Artois (transferred to LSU in Baton Rouge) – Shreveport public safety commissioner 1962–1976
Taylor Scott Davis - church musician and composer
John Allen Dixon (Class of 1940, 1920–2003) – Chief Justice of the Louisiana Supreme Court
Scott Durbin – member of the children's music group Imagination Movers
George Dement (1922–2014) – mayor of Bossier City from 1989 to 2005; attended after World War II but did not graduate; holds honorary doctorate from Centenary
D. L. Dykes, Jr. (1917–1997) – pastor of First United Methodist Church in Shreveport from 1955 to 1984; urged racial harmony in civil rights movement; known for opposition to "Religious Right"
Lenny Fant (Class of 1950, 1923–1998) – basketball coach at the University of Louisiana at Monroe, 1957–1979
William J. Fleniken – U. S. attorney, 1950–1953; judge of the Louisiana 1st Judicial District Court, 1961–1979
Thomas Wafer Fuller (Class of 1890) – state senator, newspaper publisher, Webster Parish school superintendent
William Pike Hall, Sr. – state senator for Caddo and DeSoto parishes from 1924 to 1932, Shreveport attorney
John Spencer Hardy (Class of 1938, 1913–2012) – Lieutenant General of the United States Air Force, later member of the Centenary board of directors and the Hall of Fame
Lovette Hill – former head baseball coach for the University of Houston
James Hoyt (baseball) – pitcher, most recently for the Los Angeles Angels
Cal Hubbard – former professional football player, member of Baseball Hall of Fame and the Professional Football Hall of Fame
Whitfield Jack (attended 1924, 1906–1989) – Shreveport attorney and World War II United States Army office; major general in United States Army Reserve
Edward Kennon – Shreveport-area developer and former member of the Louisiana Public Service Commission (1973–1984)
Clyde Lee – former head football coach for the University of Houston
Seth Lugo (2008–2011) – pitcher for the San Diego Padres
Max T. Malone – former state senator from Caddo and Bossier parishes, businessman
James M. McCoy (Class of 1966), sixth Chief Master Sergeant of the Air Force.
Eldred Kurtz Means (March 11, 1878 - February 19, 1957)  Minister, author
Charlotte Moorman – avant-garde performance artist
Taylor W. O'Hearn – former member of the Louisiana House of Representatives, studied for bar exam through Centenary
W. Darrell Overdyke (Class of 1928, 1907–1973) – historian, faculty member ca. 1929 until his death
Robert Parish – basketball player, four-time NBA champion, member of the Basketball Hall of Fame
Buddy Parker – professional football player and head coach of Detroit Lions and Pittsburgh Steelers
Clarence Cullam Pope – Bishop of Fort Worth, Texas
Robert G. Pugh (Class of 1946, 1924–2007) – Shreveport attorney, civic leader, and gubernatorial advisor
E.S. Richardson (Class of 1936, 1875–1950) – former president of Louisiana Tech University
Edward White Robertson (1823–1887) – United States Representative from Louisiana
Versha Sharma (Class of 2008) - current Editor-in-chief at Teen Vogue
Virginia Shehee (Class of 1943, 1923–2015) – first woman elected to the Louisiana State Senate; businesswoman and philanthropist
Linus A. Sims – educator who founded Southeastern Louisiana University in Hammond
Hal Sutton  – PGA Tour golfer; captain of the 2004 U.S. Ryder Cup team
Rose Van Thyn (Class of 2002, 1921–2010), honorary doctorate – Auschwitz concentration camp survivor, holocaust educator
Jeffrey P. Victory (Class of 1967, born 1946) – associate justice of the Louisiana Supreme Court
Dayton Waller (Class of 1947, 1925–2015) – Shreveport businessman and former state representative
Steve Weddle (Class of 1992) – poet and author
Patrick C. Williams (born 1963) – state representative for Caddo Parish since 2007
Louise Yazbeck (1910-1995) - composer
J. Smith Young (1834–1916) – member of the United States House of Representatives from Louisiana
James Logie Dobie (Class of 1956, 1934–2017) – paleontologist and herpetologist, Auburn University faculty (1967–1996)
Kathy Johnson (1959-) - American olympic gymnast, silver and gold medalist

Faculty and staff

Katherine Jackson French (1875-1958) - ballad collector 
Earle Labor – Official biographer of novelist Jack London; curator of the Jack London Museum in Shreveport.
Walter M. Lowrey – Louisiana historian
Arthur C. Morgan – sculptor

Other
Rose Van Thyn (1921–2010) – Holocaust survivor; Attaway Fellow in Civic Culture; Honorary Doctorate of Humane Letters in 2002; Van Thyn Endowed Professorship

References

External links

Centenary College Athletics website

 
Liberal arts colleges in Louisiana
University and college buildings on the National Register of Historic Places in Louisiana
Educational institutions established in 1825
Universities and colleges accredited by the Southern Association of Colleges and Schools
Buildings and structures in Shreveport, Louisiana
1825 establishments in Louisiana
National Register of Historic Places in Caddo Parish, Louisiana
Private universities and colleges in Louisiana